Kyŏngsŏng County is a kun, or county, on the central coast of North Hamgyong, North Korea. The administrative center is located in Kyŏngsŏng-ŭp.

Geography
To the west and southwest, Kyŏngsŏng is flanked by mountains, while to the east it borders Kyŏngsŏng Bay in the Sea of Japan (East Sea of Korea). In the coastal area a number of small plains are found, including Kyŏngsŏng Plain. Numerous small streams flow into the Sea of Japan, including the Kwangmoch'ŏn, Segolch'ŏn, Pokkokch'ŏn, and Och'onch'ŏn.

There are also numerous hot springs in the area. Eighty percent of the county is composed of mountain forests, of which 58.9% is evergreen and 39.9% is deciduous.

Due to its location on the Sea of Japan, Kyŏngsŏng's climate is generally mild, but the region is prone to fog. The average annual rainfall is  along the coast, but  in the west.

Administrative divisions
Kyŏngsŏng County is divided into 1 ŭp (town), 5  (workers' districts) and 14 ri (villages):

Economy

Agriculture and fishery
Rice farming is carried out in the eastern region of Kyŏngsŏng. In the orchards, pears are the predominant crop. Small-scale fishing is also carried out.

Manufacturing
The area is known in North Korea as a center of ceramics manufacture.

Tourism
Tourist attractions include Kyŏngsŏng Castle and Kyŏngsŏng Nammun.

Education
Kyongsong Industrial College (경성공업대학)
Kyongsong College of Ceramics (경성도자기단과대학)
Kyongsong Technical School of Medicine (경성의학전문학교)

Transportation
Kyŏngsŏng lies on the Pyŏngra Line railroad.

Divisions
The county is divided into one town (ŭp), five worker's districts ("rodongjagu"), and 15 villages (ri).

See also
Geography of North Korea

References

Counties of North Hamgyong